Bozymchak is an open-pit copper mine and concentrator in Ala-Bukinsky region, Jalal-Abad, Kyrgyzstan; it also contains gold by-product. It is being developed by KAZ Minerals. The project commenced commissioning in 2014.

General

In 2014, 426 kt of ore was mined at Bozymchak mine with an average copper grade of 1%. Bozymchak is expected to have an average annual output of 6 kt of copper cathode and 28 koz of gold bar over the 18 years of operational life.

See also
 KAZ Minerals
 Bozshakol
 Aktogay
 Koksay

References

External links 
 
 Bozymchak page

Economy of Kyrgyzstan
Surface mines in Kyrgyzstan
Mining in Kyrgyzstan
Copper mines in Kyrgyzstan